Homotrema is a genus of foraminifers belonging to the family Homotrematidae.

The species of this genus are found in subtropical and tropical regions.

Species:

Homotrema hemispherica 
Homotrema pacifica 
Homotrema rubra 
Homotrema singaporensis

References

Rotaliida